Wangdu is a county of west-central Hebei province, China, directly serviced by China National Highway 107.

Administrative divisions
There are 2 towns and 6 townships under the county's administration.

Towns:
Wangdu, Gudian

Townships:
Sizhuang Township, Zhaozhuang Township, Heibao Township, Gaoling Township, Zhonghanzhuang Township, Jiacun Township

Climate

External links

Geography of Baoding
County-level divisions of Hebei